Országos Bajnokság I (commonly abbreviated OB I) is the highest level water polo league for men in Hungary, that is administered and supervised by the Hungarian Water Polo Federation. Since 2009, after signed a four-year sponsorship contract with telecommunications company Vodafone, the competition is officially known as Vodafone OB I.

Current teams

The following 14 clubs compete in the OB I during the 2022–23 season:

Previous winners

 1904: Balaton
 1905: Balaton 
 1906: Magyar Úszó Egylet
 1907: Magyar Úszó Egylet 
 1908: Magyar Úszó Egylet 
 1909: Magyar Úszó Egylet 
 1910: Ferencváros
 1911: Ferencváros 
 1912: Ferencváros 
 1913: Ferencváros 
 1914-16 – Not held due to WW I
 1917: MAFC
 1918: Ferencváros 
 1919: Ferencváros 
 1920: Ferencváros 
 1921: Ferencváros 
 1922: Ferencváros 
 1923: III. Kerület
 1924: III. Kerület 
 1925: Ferencváros 
 1926: Ferencváros 
 1927: Ferencváros 
 1928: III. Kerület 
 1929: MAC
 1930: Újpest
 1931: Újpest 
 1932: Újpest 
 1933: Újpest 
 1934: Újpest 
 1935: Újpest 
 1936: Újpest 
 1937: Újpest 
 1938: Újpest 
 1939: Újpest 
 1940: BSE
 1941: Újpest 
 1942: Újpest 
 1943: MAC 
 1944: Ferencváros 
 1945: Újpest 
 1946: Újpest 
 1947: Vasas
 1948: Újpest 
 1949: Vasas 
 1950: Újpest 
 1951: Újpest 
 1952: Újpest 
 1953: Vasas 
 1954: Szolnok
 1955: Újpest 
 1956: Ferencváros 
 1957: Szolnok 
 1958: Szolnok 
 1959: Szolnok 
 1960: Újpest 
 1961: Szolnok 
 1962: Ferencváros 
 1963: Ferencváros 
 1964: Szolnok 
 1965: Ferencváros 
 1966: BVSC
 1967: Újpest 
 1968: Ferencváros 
 1969: OSC
 1970: OSC 
 1971: OSC 
 1972: OSC 
 1973: OSC 
 1974: OSC 
 1975: Vasas 
 1976: Vasas 
 1977: Vasas 
 1978: OSC 
 1979: Vasas 
 1980: Vasas 
 1981: Vasas 
 1982: Vasas 
 1983: Vasas 
 1984: Vasas 
 1984/85: BVSC 
 1985/86: Újpest 
 1986/87: BVSC 
 1987/88: Ferencváros 
 1988/89: Vasas 
 1989/90: Ferencváros 
 1990/91: Újpest 
 1991/92: Tungsram
 1992/93: Újpest 
 1993/94: Újpest 
 1994/95: Újpest 
 1995/96: BVSC 
 1996/97: BVSC 
 1997/98: BVSC 
 1998/99: BVSC 
 1999/00: Ferencváros 
 2000/01: Bp. Honvéd
 2001/02: Bp. Honvéd 
 2002/03: Bp. Honvéd 
 2003/04: Bp. Honvéd 
 2004/05: Bp. Honvéd 
 2005/06: Bp. Honvéd 
 2006/07: Vasas 
 2007/08: Vasas 
 2008/09: Vasas 
 2009/10: Vasas 
 2010/11: Eger
 2011/12: Vasas 
 2012/13: Eger 
 2013/14: Eger 
 2014/15: Szolnok 
 2015/16: Szolnok 
 2016/17: Szolnok 
 2017/18: Ferencváros 
 2018/19: Ferencváros 
 2019/20 – Canceled due to COVID-19 pandemic
 2020/21: Szolnok 
 2021/22: Ferencváros

Notes
1914–16: Cancelled due to war.
2019–20: Canceled due to COVID-19 pandemic.

Name changes
Budapesti Honvéd SE (Bp. Honvéd): 1949 Budapesti Honvéd SE, 1999 Honvéd-Spartacus, 2000 Honvéd Domino, 2001 Domino-BHSE, 2007 Domino-Honvéd, 2010 Grupama Honvéd, 2013 Racionet Honvéd, 2018 Bp. Honvéd
Ferencvárosi TC (FTC): (1904 Ferencvárosi TC, 1950 EDOSZ, 1951 Bp. Kinizsi, 1957 Ferencváros, 1989 FTC-Törley, 1993 Ferencváros, 1994 FTC-Vitasport, 1996 FTC-Vitalin, 1999 FTC-Thomas Jeans, 2000 FTC-Mirato, 2001 FTC-VMAX, 2003 Jégcsillag-FTC, 2004 Betonút-FTC, 2006 FTC-Aprilia, 2008 FTC-Fisher Klíma, 2012 Széchenyi Bank-FTC, 2014 Ferencváros, 2015 FTC-PQS Waterpolo, 2018 FTC-Telekom Waterpolo)
Újpesti TE (UTE): 1891 Újpesti TE, 1950 Bp. Dózsa, 1957 Újpesti Dózsa, 1990 Újpest, 1993 UTE-Primavera, 1994 UTE-Office & Home, 1998 UTE-Taxi2000, 1999 UTE-Santal-Taxi2000, 2000 UTE-Humet, 2002 UTE-Taxi2000, 2004 UTE-VB Leasing, 2006 UTE-Óbuda-Újlak, 2007 Uniqa-UTE, 2010 Újpest)

Performances

By club

 The bolded teams are currently playing in the 2021-22 season of the Hungarian League.

Most seasons

The number of seasons that each team (in alphabetical order) has played in the top division from 1904 until 2021–22. A total of 61 teams had competed in at least one season at the top division. Ferencváros is the only teams to have played in the top division in every season since the league's inception in its modern form. 

111: Ferencváros
87: Újpest
85: Eger
74: Vasas
71: BVSC, Szolnok
61: Bp. Honvéd
56: OSC
52: Szentes
44: Szeged
42: Bp. Spartacus
38: Tungsram
36: MTK Budapest
31: Tatabánya
24: III. Kerület
23: MAC
20: Nemzeti SC
18: MAFC, KSI
17: Magyar Úszó Egylet
16: Csepel, Pécsi VSK
12: Szegedi Úszó Egylet
11: BEAC, Debrecen
10: Kaposvár
9: BSE
8: BKV Előre, Bp. Vörös Meteor, UVSE
7: Miskolc
5: Hódmezővásárhely, Kecskemét
3: Balatoni Úszó Egylet, Óbuda TE, Vívó és Atlétikai Club, Volán, Cegléd, Neptun VSC, AVUS
2: Gamma SE, BBTE, Erzsébeti TC, Marosvásárhelyi SE, Tipográfia NyTE, Szegedi MTE, Szegedi Dózsa, Szent István University, Fehérvár Póló SE
1: Postatakarékpénztár, Szegedi VSE, Közalkalmazottak SE, Angyalföldi Sportiskola DSE, Eszterházy Károly University, YBL Waterpolo Club

The teams in Bold participate in the 2021–22 OB I.

Format
As we can see from the chart the number of teams in the Hungarian First Division changed a lot and continuously. The league started in 1904 with four teams and with the formation of teams the league expanded continuously. Currently, there are 14 teams in the first division.

Hungarian clubs in European competitions

See also
 Magyar Kupa (National Cup of Hungary)
 Hungary men's national water polo team

References

External links
 Hungarian Water Polo Federaration 
 OB I at waterpoloworld.com 

Hun
1904 establishments in Austria-Hungary
 
Professional sports leagues in Hungary